Civic Commitment (IC) was an Italian centrist electoral alliance running in the 2022 general election, composed of Luigi Di Maio's Together for the Future (IpF) and Bruno Tabacci's Democratic Centre (CD).

History
In June 2022, the minister of foreign affairs Luigi Di Maio, along with several deputies and senators, left the Five Star Movement (M5S) and launched Together for the Future (IpF), a parliamentary group active both in the Senate and the Chamber, which was joined also by two MEPs. Following the resignation of prime minister Mario Draghi and the call for a snap election to be held in September, Di Maio started talks with Bruno Tabacci, a Christian leftist politician and leader of Democratic Centre (CD), around the possibility of forming a joint list for the upcoming election.

On 1 August, Di Maio and Tabacci, along with Lucia Azzolina, Emilio Carelli, Laura Castelli and other former members of the M5S, presented their joint list named "Civic Commitment", along with the new party's logo. The Italian Republican Party (PRI) initially joined the list but it withdrew on 8 August to join forces with Italia Viva (IV). Civic Commitment will be part of the centre-left coalition in the 2022 general election. During the event, Di Maio strongly criticized Giuseppe Conte, Matteo Salvini and Silvio Berlusconi, labeling them as "extremist", adding that "their victory would isolate Italy from Europe". On 11 August, Alessio Pascucci, leading member of Italia in Comune and leader of the National Civic Agenda/Network joined IC, but later Pascucci left IC blaming the leadership for ignoring them.

After the delusional electoral result, on October 7 Tabacci declared the electoral experience of Civic Commitment concluded. Di Maio's party, IpF, ceased to exist on October 13 with the beginning of the new legislature. On 22 October Di Maio resigned from the office of leader of Civic Commitment, leaving the future of the party uncertain.

Composition

Electoral results

Italian Parliament

References

2022 establishments in Italy
Centrist parties in Europe
Centrist parties in Italy
Defunct political party alliances in Italy
Political parties established in 2022